Forest Glen is a census-designated place (CDP) in Montgomery County, Maryland, United States. Its population was 6,897 as of the 2020 census.

Geography
Forest Glen is recognized by the United States Census Bureau as a census-designated place, and by the United States Geological Survey as a populated place located at  (39.018909, −77.046797). It is located just north of central Silver Spring which it is a part of, and just north of the Capital Beltway around Georgia Avenue.

Demographics

As of the census of 2000, there were 7,344 people, 3,003 households, and 1,792 families residing in the area. The racial makeup of the area was 65.32% White, 17.46% African American, 0.41% Native American, 7.76% Asian, 0.05% Pacific Islander, 4.98% from other races, and 4.02% from two or more races. Hispanics or Latinos of any race constituted 14.26% of the population.

There were 3,003 households, out of which 28.1% had children under the age of 18 living with them, 45.9% were married couples living together, 10.3% had a female householder with no husband present, and 40.3% were non-families. Households made up of individuals constituted 33.1%, and 14.0% had someone living alone who was 65 years of age or older. The average household size was 2.41 and the average family size was 3.09.

In the area, the population was spread out, with 21.7% under the age of 18, 5.8% from 18 to 24, 33.0% from 25 to 44, 23.8% from 45 to 64, and 15.6% who were 65 years of age or older. The median age was 39 years. For every 100 females, there were 87.3 males. For every 100 females age 18 and over, there were 82.6 males.

The median income for a household in the area was $59,844, and the median income for a family was $74,607. Males had a median income of $45,613 versus $38,975 for females. The per capita income for the area was $28,536. 3.8% of the population and 1.4% of families were below the poverty line. 1.1% of those under the age of 18 and 7.9% of those 65 and older were living below the poverty line.

Community
Forest Glen has access to many parks including Rock Creek Park and Sligo Creek Park. It is also home to the National Museum of Health and Medicine and a regional hospital, Holy Cross Hospital. The community is also served by the Friends of Forest Glen advocacy group. Forest Glen is also home to the National Park Seminary, a unique and landmark residential community in an old building complex that served as a prestigious hotel, a girls' school, and as a military building.

History
Forest Glen was once part of a land grant made in 1680 to one of Archbishop John Carroll's ancestors.

Daniel Carroll, one of the Founding Fathers of the United States, lived in Forest Glen. Carroll's body was buried in St. John the Evangelist Catholic Church Cemetery in Forest Glen. The church building was originally built as a wood-framed structure in 1774. It was replaced by a brick structure in 1894.

The Forest Estates neighborhood of Forest Glen was developed in the 1940s by Jewish real estate developers. The area was formerly rural. Forest Estates was desirable to white Jewish homeowners moving to the suburbs from the city, because some white Christian neighborhoods in Washington, D.C. used antisemitic and racist covenants in real estate to exclude Jews, as well as African-Americans and other people of color. Antisemitic covenants were not used in Forest Estates, however, some Jewish developers used anti-Black covenants to exclude African-Americans. In 1945, Forest Glen Homes purchased land formerly owned by the Getty family, who had farmed the land since 1883. The houses in Forest Estates began construction in 1947. The Forest Glen Homes real estate company included Leo Minskoff, Sadie Milestone, Philip Milestone, and several others. Other builders in Forest Glen included the Russian immigrant Nathan Brisker and the Italian immigrant Anthony Campitelli.

Forest Glen station was originally planned to be built above-ground, which would have required the demolition of about fifteen homes. After community opposition to the above-ground station, Montgomery County approved a modified plan for an underground station. The community also opposed the originally planned location for the station, on the east side of Georgia Avenue between Sherwood Road and Tilton Drive. The station opened on September 22, 1990.

Forest Glen has been the subject of redevelopment for many years. In 2017, Montgomery County Park and Planning Commission began the consolidated Forest Glen/Montgomery Hills sector plan review.

In 2018, WMATA announced that it would do a feasibility study on the redevelopment of the  parking lot of Forest Glen station.

In December 2021, dozens of antisemitic fliers were posted in the Forest Estates neighborhood of Forest Glen. The fliers contained a conspiracy theory blaming Jews for the COVID-19 pandemic and promoted an antisemitic website that advocates Holocaust denial and supports Adolph Hitler.

References

 
Census-designated places in Maryland
Census-designated places in Montgomery County, Maryland
Historic Jewish communities in the United States
Jews and Judaism in Silver Spring, Maryland